Senator Ewing may refer to:

Members of the United States Senate
Thomas Ewing (1789–1871), U.S. Senator from Ohio from 1850 to 1851
William Lee D. Ewing (1795–1846), U.S. Senator from Illinois

United States state senate members
Bob Ewing (politician) (born 1954), South Dakota State Senate
Clinton L. Ewing (1879–1953), Illinois State Senate
James Ewing (Pennsylvania politician) (1736–1806), Pennsylvania State Senate
John H. Ewing (1918–2012), New Jersey State Senate
John Hoge Ewing (1796–1887), Pennsylvania State Senate
Wayne S. Ewing (1929–2010), Pennsylvania State Senate